Raaj Kumar Anand (born 14 September 1966) is the cabinet minister for Social Welfare, Labour, Employment, SC & ST, Land & Building, Cooperative, Gurudwara Elections in Arvind Kejriwal led Delhi government. He represents Patel Nagar constituency and a member of the national council of the Aam Aadmi Party.

Biography
Rajkumar Anand's life journey so far has been very struggling. Due to poverty, his parents had to send him to his maternal grandparents in Aligarh. Where his maternal grandfather was a ragman. His financial condition was also not that good so that he could educate his grandson. To complete his early education, Rajkumar Anand had to work as a child laborer in a lock factory in Aligarh. Further he completed his M.A. by giving tuition.

From making pillows by using discarded foam from factories to becoming a successful businessman in Rexine Leather, his journey may appear to be an easy and simple, but in reality, it has gone through many difficulties and ups and downs.

Mr. Anand's contribution in the field of social service has also been commendable. He, along with some of his colleagues, formed the 'Anandpath Path Foundation' for the betterment of the underprivileged people. Under this, many tuition centers were also started in slum area with the name of ' Dr. Ambedkar Pathshala'.

The people of the underprivileged society do not have to face difficulties in taking loans, that's why they created another organization SCOTIC, which basically helps in getting loans by establishing a dialogue between the bank and the borrowers.

Raaj is married to Veena Anand, who was Ex-MLA of Patel Nagar From Aam Aadmi Party in 2013.

Early life and education
Raaj Kumar Anand has completed his post-graduation in Political Science from Bundelkhand University

Political career
Raaj Kumar Anand is a State Cabinet Minister who holds the portfolio of Education, Health, Gurudwara Elections, SC & ST, Social Welfare, Cooperative, Land & Building, Vigilance, Services, Tourism, Art, Culture & Language, Labour, Employment, and Industries. He represented the Patel Nagar Constituency from 2020 to the present and a member of the national council of the Aam Aadmi Party.

Member of Legislative Assembly (2020 - present)
Since 2020, he is an elected member of the 7th Delhi Assembly.

Committee assignments of Delhi Legislative Assembly
 Member (2022-2023), Committee on Government Undertakings

Electoral performance

References 

Living people
Delhi MLAs 2020–2025
Aam Aadmi Party politicians from Delhi
Bundelkhand University alumni
Businesspeople from Delhi
Year of birth missing (living people)